The Zhengzhou Open is a tournament for professional female tennis players played on outdoor hardcourts. The event has been held in Zhengzhou, China, since 2014 as an ITF tournament and then as WTA 125 tournament in 2017 and 2018.

The event was subsequently upgraded and from 2019 onward it would be classified as a WTA Premier level tournament, replacing the Connecticut Open in the United States.

Past finals

Doubles

External links
 ITF search
 WTA Zhengzhou Open website
 Official website 

Zhengzhou Women's Tennis Open
Hard court tennis tournaments
Tennis tournaments in China
Recurring sporting events established in 2014
2014 establishments in China
Sport in Zhengzhou